Bad Belzig station is a railway station in the spa town of Bad Belzig, located in the Potsdam-Mittelmark district in Brandenburg, Germany.

References

Railway stations in Brandenburg
Buildings and structures in Potsdam-Mittelmark
Railway stations in Germany opened in 1879
1879 establishments in Prussia